The  was formed 1 June 1901 as the , as part of Japan's contribution to the international coalition in China during the Boxer Rebellion. It took the name China Garrison Army from 14 April 1912 and onward, though was typically referred to as the Tianjin Garrison.

History
The IJA 5th Division was dispatched to protect Japanese nationals and property in Tianjin, China in June 1900 after the start of the Boxer Rebellion. It formed the core of the Japanese expeditionary forces in northern China. Under the terms of the Boxer Protocol, Japan was allowed to maintain a military garrison to guard its embassy, concessions in China, as well as certain strategic fortifications and ports. The IJA 5th Division was thus transformed into the Chinese Empire Garrison Army in June 1901.

After the Xinhai Revolution overthrew the Qing dynasty and the Republic of China was proclaimed in 1911, the name was considered an anachronism, and the Chinese Empire Garrison Army was thus renamed in 1912 to the China Garrison Army.

From April 1936, as diplomatic relations between Japan and China continued to worsen, the China Garrison Army was reinforced with ten companies of infantry and one combined regiment.

Its forces were involved in the clash with the Chinese in the Marco Polo Bridge Incident that triggered the Second Sino-Japanese War. The China Garrison Army was reinforced in July 1937 with the IJA 20th Division from Korea and two Independent combined brigades from the Kwantung Army in Manchukuo, and subsequently with an additional three infantry divisions (the IJA 5th Division, IJA 6th Division and IJA 10th Division) from the Japanese home islands for the Battle of Beiping-Tianjin and Operation Chahar.

The China Garrison Army was abolished on 26 August 1937 and its forces redistributed between the Japanese First Army, Japanese Second Army and Japanese Northern China Area Army. Garrison duties for the Tianjin area were assigned to the IJA 27th Division.

List of Commanders

Commanding officer

Chief of Staff

References

Books

External links
 Japanese China Garrison Army (In Japanese)

China
Military units and formations established in 1901
Military units and formations disestablished in 1937